= Championship Blackjack =

1982 gambling video game

- Developer(s): PCSoftware
- Publisher(s): PCSoftware
- Release: 1982

Championship Blackjack is a 1982 video game published by PCSoftware.

== Gameplay ==
Championship Blackjack is a game in which blackjack is played using established professional gambling rules.

== Reception ==
Jim Zegers reviewed the game for Computer Gaming World, and stated that "If you are a beginning blackjack player, a hearty welcome to the game. You won't find a more helpful and enjoyable way of learning than Championship Blackjack. If you're an expert, counter, tournament player, or professional, you will find Championship Blackjack to be an outstanding computer game."

== Reviews ==
- PC Magazine - Dec, 1982
